The 1990 UCI Road World Cup was the second edition of the UCI Road World Cup. From the 1989 edition, an individual time trial finale event in Lunel, France, was added.

Races

Final standings

Riders

Teams

References
 Complete results from Cyclingbase.com 
 Final classification for individuals and teams from memoire-du-cyclisme.net

 
 
UCI Road World Cup (men)